Berthold Ribbentrop  was a pioneering forester from Germany who worked in India with Sir Dietrich Brandis and others.  He is said to have inspired Rudyard Kipling's character of Muller in In the Rukh (1893), one of the earliest of his Jungle Book stories.

Berthold Ribbentrop was Inspector-General of Forests to the Government of India from 1885.  In 1900 he wrote Forestry in British India, in which he wrote that he was coming to the end of his career.  He described the early lack of forestry expertise among the British administrators of India, and wrote

References

Companions of the Order of the Indian Empire
German earth scientists
Imperial Forestry Service officers
German foresters
Year of birth missing
Year of death missing
German expatriates in India